Erdel is the historical name of Transylvania in Turkish.

Erdel may also refer to:

People 
 Cavit Erdel, Turkish military officer
 Christina Erdel, German figure skater
 Zsolt Erdel, Hungarian former professional boxer
 Saul Erdel, a fictitious character created by DC Comics
 Mete Erdel, is a music producer from Netherlands. Official website: Erdel.com

Places 
 Erdel, İvrindi, a village
 Principality of Transylvania, also known as "Erdel Voyvodalığı" in Turkish
 Erdel (Erdèl) is the name in the Bergamasque dialect of the village Verdello, located in the province of Bergamo (Italy).

See also 
 Transylvania (disambiguation)